Mosalsky (masculine), Mosalskaya (feminine), or Mosalskoye (neuter) is the name of several rural localities in Russia:
Mosalskoye, Moscow Oblast, a village under the administrative jurisdiction of the work settlement of Fryanovo, Shchyolkovsky District, Moscow Oblast
Mosalskoye, Voronezh Oblast, a selo in Mosalskoye Rural Settlement of Kashirsky District of Voronezh Oblast